Antonio Jesús Garrido Benito (born 20 August 1971 in Seville, Province of Seville, Andalusia, Spain) is a Spanish actor and TV presenter.

He started in a theatre company, taking part in several plays like Bajarse al moro, Breve Brecht, Un nuevo mundo, El barbero de Sevilla, Réquiem de Berlín  or El otro lado de la cama. He played Joaquín in La chica de ayer (2009).

Filmography
Camarón by Jaime Chávarri, 2005
Desde que amanece apetece by Antonio del Real, 2005
El camino de los ingleses by Antonio Banderas, 2005
Diario de una Ninfómana by Christian Molina, 2008
The End (2012)

Television

As an actor
Al filo de la ley, TVE, 2005
Los Simuladores, Cuatro, 2006–2007
La chica de ayer, Antena 3, 2009
Los protegidos, Antena 3, 2010

TV presenter
El día D, Canal Sur
Vamos de fiesta, Canal Sur
Andalucía directo, Canal Sur
Gente de mente, Cuatro, 2007
Identity, TVE, 2007–2008
Hijos de Babel, TVE, 2008
¿Quién quiere ser millonario? (``Who Wants to Be a Millionaire?''), Antena 3, 2009

Prizes
Premios de la Unión de Actores (Prizes of Actors' Union), Nomination for Best Theatre Actor in a Supporting Role, 2005

References

External links

1971 births
Living people
People from Seville
Spanish television presenters
Spanish male stage actors
Spanish male film actors
Spanish male television actors
21st-century Spanish male actors